Mỹ An may refer to several places in Vietnam, including:

Mỹ An, Đà Nẵng, a ward of Ngũ Hành Sơn District
Mỹ An (township), a township and capital of Tháp Mười District in Đồng Tháp Province
Mỹ An, An Giang, a commune of Chợ Mới District, An Giang
Mỹ An, Bắc Giang, a commune of Lục Ngạn District
Mỹ An, Vĩnh Long, a commune of Mang Thít District
Mỹ An, Bình Định, a commune of Phù Mỹ District
Mỹ An, Bến Tre, a commune of Thạnh Phú District
Mỹ An (commune in Đồng Tháp), a commune of Tháp Mười District
Mỹ An, Long An, a commune of Thủ Thừa District